James Gurney (born June 14, 1958) is an American artist and author known for his illustrated book series Dinotopia, which is presented in the form of a 19th-century explorer's 
journal from an island utopia cohabited by humans and dinosaurs. 

Gurney is also a paleoartist who depicts and restores in his paintings extinct fauna such as both avian and non-avian dinosaurs.

Early life and education
Gurney grew up in Palo Alto, California, the youngest of five children of Joanna and Robert Gurney, a mechanical engineer. 

Encouraged to tinker in the workshop, he built puppets, gliders, masks, and kites, and taught himself to draw by means of books about the illustrators Howard Pyle and Norman Rockwell.

He studied archaeology at the University of California, Berkeley, receiving a bachelor of arts degree in anthropology with Phi Beta Kappa honors in 1979. He then studied illustration at the Art Center College of Design in Pasadena, California, for a couple of semesters.

Career
Prompted by a cross-country adventure on freight trains, he and Thomas Kinkade coauthored The Artist's Guide to Sketching in 1982. 

Gurney and Kinkade also worked as painters of background scenes for the animated film Fire and Ice (1983), co-produced by Ralph Bakshi and Frank Frazetta.

Gurney's freelance illustration career began in the 1980s, during which time he developed his characteristic realistic renderings of fantastic scenes, painted in oil using methods similar to the academic realists and Golden Age illustrators. He painted more than 70 covers for science fiction and fantasy paperback novels, and he created several stamp designs for the U.S. Postal Service, most notably The World of Dinosaurs in 1996.

Starting in 1983, he began work on over a dozen assignments for National Geographic magazine, including reconstructions of the ancient Moche, Kushite, and Etruscan civilizations, and the Jason and Ulysses voyages for Tim Severin.

The inspiration that came from researching these archaeological reconstructions led to a series of lost-world panoramas, including Waterfall City (1988) and Dinosaur Parade (1989).

With the encouragement of retired publishers Ian and Betty Ballantine, he discontinued his freelance work and committed two years' time to writing and illustrating Dinotopia: A Land Apart from Time, published in 1992. The book made The New York Times Bestseller List, and won Hugo, World Fantasy, Chesley, Spectrum, and Colorado Children's Book awards. It sold over a million copies and was translated into 18 languages.

Sequels of Dinotopia that are both written and illustrated by Gurney include Dinotopia: The World Beneath (1995), Dinotopia: First Flight (1999), and Dinotopia: Journey to Chandara (2007). 

Original artwork by Gurney from the Dinotopia books has been exhibited at the National Museum of Natural History of the Smithsonian Institution, the Norman Rockwell Museum, the Royal Tyrrell Museum and is currently on tour to museums throughout the United States and Europe.

Most recently, he has written two art-instruction books: Imaginative Realism: How to Paint What Doesn't Exist (2009), a book about drawing and painting things that do not exist; and Color and Light: A Guide for the Realist Painter (2010). These books are based upon Gurney's blog posts, in which he gives practical advice to realist and fantasy artists. 

On February 21, 2012, Gurney was inducted as a Living Master by the Art Renewal Center.

The dinosaur Torvosaurus gurneyi was named in honor of Gurney in 2014.

Personal life
Gurney lives in Rhinebeck, New York, in the Hudson Valley of New York State.

References

Further reading

External links
 , Gurney's official website
 Dinotopia official site
 James Gurney blog
 Publisher's website

1958 births
20th-century American male artists
20th-century American male writers
20th-century American non-fiction writers
20th-century American novelists
20th-century American painters
21st-century American male artists
21st-century American male writers
21st-century American non-fiction writers
21st-century American novelists
21st-century American painters
American art writers 
American fantasy writers
American illustrators
 American instructional writers
American male non-fiction writers
American male novelists
American stamp designers
Art Center College of Design alumni
Dinotopia
Hugo Award-winning artists
Living people
National Geographic people
Novelists from California
Novelists from New York (state)
Painters from California
Painters from New York (state)
Paleoartists
People from Rhinebeck, New York
University of California, Berkeley alumni
World Fantasy Award-winning artists
Writers from Palo Alto, California